Kalleh Bon (also Romanized as Kaleh Bon) is a village in Hasan Reza Rural District, in the Central District of Juybar County, Mazandaran Province, Iran. At the 2006 census, its population was 500, in 144 families.

References 

Populated places in Juybar County